Duvesjön (or Slätten) is a locality situated in Kungälv Municipality, Västra Götaland County, Sweden with 247 inhabitants in 2010.

References 

Populated places in Västra Götaland County
Populated places in Kungälv Municipality